The Kenya national women's cricket team is the team that represents the country of Kenya in international women's cricket. Their first matches were in January 2006 when they played a triangular series against Kenya A and Uganda.

History
Kenya played in the African regional qualifiers for the 2009 World Cup in December 2006 against Tanzania, Uganda and Zimbabwe. They performed poorly in the tournament, finishing in last place. 

In December 2009, they won the Africa Women Championships under the captainship of Emily Ruto.

In 2008, Sarah Bhakita scored an unbeaten 186 against Rwanda to emerge the second woman in the world to achieve the feat in an international match. The team also participated in the World Cup Qualifiers held in Nairobi in December 2010, missing an opportunity to represent the continent by negligible scores, having tied with Zimbabwe at second place. South Africa who won all their matches and Zimbabwe achieved that feat instead.

In December 2011, the women' team represented the country in Kampala, Uganda at the annual Africa Cricket Championships finishing fourth after the winners Uganda, Tanzania and Namibia. the other participating countries were Nigeria and Sierra Leone.

In April 2016, the team played in 2016 ICC Africa Women's World Twenty20 to qualify for 2018 ICC Women's World Twenty20 in the West Indies.

In April 2018, the International Cricket Council (ICC) granted full Women's Twenty20 International (WT20I) status to all its members. Therefore, all Twenty20 matches played between Kenya women and another international side after 1 July 2018 will be a full WT20I. Kenya made its Twenty20 International debut on 6 April 2019 against Zimbabwe during the 2019 Victoria Tri-Series in Kampala, Uganda.

Current Squad

This lists all the players who played for Kenya in the past 12 months or were named in the most recent squad. Updated on 21 December 2022.

Records and statistics
International Match Summary — Kenya Women
 
Last updated 21 December 2022

Twenty20 International 

 Highest team total: 170/4 v Sierra Leone, May 6, 2019, at Takashinga Cricket Club, Harare
 Highest individual score: 73, Margaret Ngoche v Sierra Leone, May 6, 2019, at Takashinga Cricket Club, Harare
 Best individual bowling figures: 6/16, Sarah Wetoto v Namibia, June 12, 2021, at Gahanga International Cricket Stadium, Kigali

Most T20I runs for Kenya Women

Most T20I wickets for Kenya Women

WT20I record versus other nations

''Records complete to WT20I #1336. Last updated 21 December 2022.

See also
 List of Kenya women Twenty20 International cricketers

References

External links 
 Fixtures from Kenya's first matches
 Scorecards for African World Cup qualifiers in December 2006

Cricket, women's
Women's national cricket teams
Women
Women's cricket in Kenya